Oselna Glacier is the 4 km long in east-west direction and 1 km wide glacier on the west side of Havre Mountains in northern Alexander Island, Antarctica. The glacier is situated south of Pipkov Glacier and north of Manolov Glacier. It drains the southwest slopes of Simon Peak, flows southwestwards and enters Lazarev Bay north of Kamhi Point. The feature is named after the settlement of Oselna in Northwestern Bulgaria.

Location

Maps
 British Antarctic Territory. Scale 1:200000 topographic map. DOS 610 – W 69 70. Tolworth, UK, 1971
 British Antarctic Territory. Scale 1:250000 topographic map. Sheet SR19-20/5. APC UK, 1991
 Antarctic Digital Database (ADD). Scale 1:250000 topographic map of Antarctica. Scientific Committee on Antarctic Research (SCAR). Since 1993, regularly upgraded and updated

References
 Bulgarian Antarctic Gazetteer. Antarctic Place-names Commission. (details in Bulgarian, basic data in English)
 Oselna Glacier. SCAR Composite Gazetteer of Antarctica

External links
 Oselna Glacier. Copernix satellite image

Glaciers of Alexander Island
Bulgaria and the Antarctic